Real Ispat & Power Limited (RIPL) is an integrated steel and power manufacturing firm based in Raipur, Chhattisgarh, India. The company manufactures sponge iron, power, billet, TMT rebars, wire rod, H.B. wire, binding wire, galvanized iron (GI) wire, barbed wire and eco bricks. Main products of the company are Real Wire and GK TMT rebars.

RIPL, the flagship company of the Real Group, was incorporated on October 4, 1999, as Real Ispat Pvt Ltd, with the objective of manufacturing steel. It was reconstituted as a limited company with the current name on May 6, 2005. The company's final products, thermos-mechanically-treated (TMT) bars, wire rods, and steel wires are sold under the GK TMT Rebars and Real Wire brand names.

RIPL's subsidiaries are Shivalay Ispat and Power Pvt Ltd (SIPPL) and Real Power Pvt Ltd (RPPL). API Ispat and Powertech Pvt Ltd (API) is the latest addition to the Real Group. All five plants of the Real Group are in Chhattisgarh, with its head-office in Raipur.

Manufacturing units of the group
Real Ispat & Power Limited – Bhorjhara Division
Real Ispat & Power Limited – Urla Division
Shivalay Ispat & Power Private Limited
API Ispat & Powertech Private Limited
Real Power Private Limited

References

Steel companies of India
Electric-generation companies of India
Electric power companies of India
Companies based in Chhattisgarh
Energy companies established in 1999
Manufacturing companies established in 1999
1999 establishments in Madhya Pradesh
Indian companies established in 1999